Daniel Windahl (born 20 July 1996) is a Swedish tennis player.

Windahl has a career high ATP singles ranking of 825 achieved on 8 September 2014. He also has a career high ATP doubles ranking of 618, achieved on 16 May 2016. Windahl has won 2 ITF doubles titles.
 
Windahl has represented Sweden at Davis Cup, where he has a win–loss record of 0–2.

ITF Futures titles

Doubles: 2

References

External links 
 
 
 

1996 births
Living people
Swedish male tennis players
Tennis players from Stockholm
Sportspeople from Helsingborg